Thurman E. Anderson  (born 2 June 1932) is a retired major general in the United States Army who served as Chief of Staff of United States Army Forces Command. He is alumnus of North Georgia College.

References

1932 births
Living people
United States Army generals